Kaluki Paul Mutuku (born March 4, 1993) is a Kenyan climate activist and environmentalist, working to improve youth participation in decision-making around climate justice. He is the co-founder of Kenya Environmental Activists Network (KEAN); KEAN is a NGO that provides a platform that will bring together environmental activists. His center of attention for Africa lies around environmental rejuvenation, afforestation, organic farming and youth leadership across boards.

Biography 
Kaluki Paul Mutuku grew up in a rural Kenyan community in a family three brothers and a single mother. During his childhood, he enjoyed going to the forest to get firewood, grazing cattle, and goats. He spent his childhood in Machakos, Ukambani zone in Eastern Kenya, and he developed his love for nature in this region. He witnessed water becoming more scarce as he grew up, and the challenges his family faced due to changing climatic conditions led him to activism. He is a graduate of Environmental Conservation and Natural Resources Management from the University of Nairobi. He has great admiration for the climate activist Wangari Maathai.

Activism and work 
Mutuku has called for safe environmental practices and proper youth inclusion in Africa. With forest occupying 10% of Kenya in 1963 and only 6% in 2009, Mutuku has great concern about the decreasing forest resources in Kenya. He is of the opinion people should push for a safe and an environmentally clean world by desisting and campaigning against all practices degrading and polluting the environment. He was a member of an environmental awareness club during his college days, and since 2015, he has also been part of the African Youth Initiative on Climate Change.

Mutuku has previously worked as an environmental education officer at A Rocha Kenya, training students, farmers and communities about organic farming, biodiversity conservation and the SDG goals. He has worked as a communications lead at 350.org-Kenya team for the deCOALonize campaign and at AYICC-Kenya under the Education for sustainable Development (ESD) project. The deCOALonize campaign pushed for use of renewable alternatives rather that fossil fuel. He is also Coordinator-Environmental Advocacy/ Partnerships & Networking lead for Youth Coalition for Environmental Advocacy & Renewable Energy.

Mutuku is currently the regional director for Africa at Youth4Nature, a global initiative calling for youth led nature-based solutions. He is also an ambassador for the Global EverGreening Alliance.  In September 2018, he was part of a group of activists that signed a letter addressed to Secretary Ryan Keith Zinke opposing the lease of public land to oil and gas drilling in California.

His organization, Green Treasures Farms is using organic farming, biodiversity conservation, tree growing, environmental education and water harvesting to improve sustainable environment and income among rural Kenyan women & youth. In 2016, the Green Treasures Farms initiative nearly died due to unavailability of land. In January 2017, the initiative's new approach of working with different families with lads brought a turn to the project.

During the COVID-19 pandemic he started using digital tools to engage in educational webinars relating to climate action, and food security.

References

External links 
Green treasurers farms
Youth4nature organization 

Living people
Climate activists
Kenyan activists
1993 births
African environmentalists
University of Nairobi alumni